The Korea Economic Daily (nicknamed Hankyung (from han - South Korea and kyung - business) is a conservative and business daily newspaper in South Korea. It is the largest business newspaper by revenue in South Korea. It was founded on October 12, 1964, as the Daily Economic Newspaper and took its current name in 1980.

References

External links
Official web site (English)
Official web site (Korean)

Business newspapers
Conservative media in South Korea
Economic liberalism
Newspapers published in South Korea
Publications established in 1964